Paco Testas is a fictional character appearing in American comic books published by DC Comics.

Publication history
Paco first appeared in Infinite Crisis #3 (February 2006) and was created by writers Keith Giffen and John Rogers along with artist Cully Hamner.

Fictional character biography
When Jaime disappeared for a year, Paco was questioned by the police but was eventually released. It was then he found out that Brenda was almost beaten to death by her father, but he died a week later while driving under the influence. Brenda was luckily taken in by her aunt, Tia Amparo, and Paco visited her now and again With Brenda living in another city Paco eventually joins the Posse. While Paco was not an 'Extra' like the other posses he proved himself a worthy member. As he was not worth the time for thugs of La Dama he could keep the business side of the Posse's running. The gang worked on fake lotteries, smuggling and the occasional bodyguard work. He later began a relationship with fellow Posse member Piñata. Exactly a year later after Jaime's disappearance La Dama's thugs were about to capture Paco and Damper were it not for the timely rescue by the Blue Beetle. Overjoyed by his friend's return, he quickly brought him up to date with what happened in his absence, telling the good news to Brenda, as soon as he could.

Jaime asked his friend to organize a meeting with the gang. Regrettable to Paco, Jaime wished to talk with Posse member Probe about the nature of his new powers, but she was abducted almost a year ago and brought to Warehouse 13. The meeting was cut short as Damper's daughter Alina was abducted by the Bottom Feeder. Jaime discovered he could track DNA signatures and rescue the child, while unintentional exposing himself on television. After that a small group of the Posse used this new power to locate and rescue Probe at Warehouse 13. Paco had to moderate outside to plan an escape if anything went wrong, while the Posse and Jaime infiltrated the compound. That duty was not that safe and all too soon he was discovered by the guards outside the compound, but was rescued by the Peacemaker and Paco lost his car in the process. Not long after, he discovered that Brenda's Aunt was the crime lord La Dama who was pulling all the strings in El Paso's criminal underworld. The Posse themselves were able to escape the compound unharmed.

Paco also appeared in the Booster Gold comic book series as part of the 10-page Blue Beetle co-feature. The stories focused on a smaller cast than before, focusing on Jaime, Paco and Brenda with occasional appearances by Jaime's family.

The New 52
In September 2011, The New 52 rebooted DC's continuity. In this new timeline, Paco and Jaime Reyes were on their way to Brenda's birthday party, but were caught in the middle of a conflict between two supervillain factions. Unknown to Paco, Jaime inadvertently becomes the Blue Beetle and Paco is rescued, only suffering minor injuries. Soon after, Phobia, Warp, Plasmus and Silverback from the Brotherhood of Evil organization managed to track Paco down, but he is saved by the Blue Beetle and in the midst discovered that Jaime is the Blue Beetle, the Khaji-Da then forces Jaime to kill Paco. Jaime regains control and saved Paco by inserting him with a Transbiotic Antitrauma unit (T.A.U), which also gave Paco similar powers to the Blue Beetle; for a time Paco would wear what appears to be a red version of Jaime Reyes scarab, which appeared to grant its host super strength and ability to project energy blasts.

The T.A.U eventually sensed the lack of control Khaji-Da had and as a protocol, forced Paco to try and kill both Jaime and Khaji-Da. The T.A.U was shut down but couldn't removed, for it kept Paco alive. He joined with Brenda to look for Jaime, but the T.A.U. reactivated and turned Paco into the Blood Beetle again, kidnapping Brenda to bring out Blue Beetle. They battled and Khaji-Da found a method to save Paco, by transferring heart tissue from Jaime to Paco, patching up the wound.

In other media
 Paco appeared in several times on Batman: The Brave and the Bold, voiced by Jason Marsden. He is unaware that his best friend Jaime Reyes is in fact the Blue Beetle. Paco appeared in the episodes "The Rise of the Blue Beetle!", "Fall of the Blue Beetle!", "Night of the Huntress!" and "Revenge of the Reach!".

References

External links
 DC Comics.com: Blue Beetle (Jaime Reyes)
 DC Database Project: Blue Beetle (Jaime Reyes)

Fictional characters from Texas
Comics characters introduced in 2006
Characters created by Keith Giffen
DC Comics characters